Viktor Bannykh (1949-2003) was the commander of the State Border Guard Service of Ukraine in 1994–1999, General Colonel.

References

External links
 Viktor Bannykh profile at the Dovidka: Ukraine official today

1949 births
2003 deaths
People from Starokostiantyniv
Soviet border guards
Ukrainian border guards
Colonel Generals of Ukraine
Moscow Higher Border Command School alumni
FSB Academy alumni
Burials at Baikove Cemetery
Recipients of the Order of Bohdan Khmelnytsky, 2nd class
Recipients of the Order of Bohdan Khmelnytsky, 3rd class